Barzu (also Romanized as Barzū, Bārzū, and Borzū) is a village in Takmaran Rural District, Sarhad District, Shirvan County, North Khorasan Province, Iran. At the 2006 census, its population was 171, in 40 families.

References 

Populated places in Shirvan County